Sphaeropteris intermedia,  synonym Cyathea intermedia, is a species of tree fern endemic to the east coast of New Caledonia. Sphaeropteris intermedia is the world's largest extant species of fern.

References

External links
 

intermedia
Endemic flora of New Caledonia